The Alonzo King LINES Ballet (AKLB) is an American contemporary ballet company based in the San Francisco Bay Area. The ballet company, founded by choreographer Alonzo King, premiered at San Francisco State University's McKenna Theatre in 1982.

Background
LINES Ballet performs its home season at the Yerba Buena Center for the Arts in San Francisco while also maintaining an international touring schedule that includes featured performances at venues such as Venice Biennale in Venice, Théâtre National de Chaillot in Paris, and The Kwai Tsing Theatre in Hong Kong. LINES Ballet, which celebrated its 40th Anniversary season in 2022, features a diverse line up of dancers from countries including Germany, Canada, France, Mexico, and The United States; and presents programs that exemplify the company's artistic vision to renew and transcend traditional ballet with cross-genre collaborations.

Collaboration
Since its inception, LINES Ballet founder Alonzo King has collaborated with artists of various backgrounds including composers, musicians, vocalists, and visual artists to develop new ballet programs for the company.

Dancers
 

The listing of dancers currently performing with Alonzo King LINES Ballet as of Spring 2022:

 Babatunji Johnson
 Adji Cissoko
 Madeline DeVries
 Lorris Eichinger
 Shuaib Elhassan
 James Gowan
 Ilaria Guerra
 Maya Harr
 Tatum Quiñónez
 Michael Montgomery
 Alvaro Montelongo
 Marusya Madubuko
 Joshua Francique

Notable former dancers
Aesha Ash
Drew Jacoby
 Laurel Keen 
 Maurya Kerr
 Meredith Webster 
 Courtney Henry

Repertoire
 

A listing of current and former Alonzo King LINES Ballet programs and collaborative works:

 2022: Deep River
 2019: Pole Star & The Personal Element & AZOTH
 2018: Sutra & Common Ground
 2017: Figures of Speech
 2016: Art Songs & SAND
 2015: The Propelled Heart & Biophony
 2014: Shostakovich & The Steady Heart
 2013: Concerto for Two Violins, Meyer, & AZIMUTH
 2012: Constellation
 2011: Resin, Figures of Thought, & Triangle of the Squinches
 2010: Writing Ground & Wheel in the Middle of the Field
 2009: Scheherazade, Refraction, & Dust and Light
 2008: The Radius of Convergence, The Steady Articulation of Perseverance
 2007: Rasa, Irregular Pearl, & Long River, High Sky
 2006: Sky Clad & Migration
 2005: The Moroccan Project, Handel, Salt, Odd Fellow, & Satoh
 2004: Before the Blues, Rite of Spring, Baker Fix, Coleman Hawkins, & The Patience of Aridity, Waiting for Petrichor
 2003: Heart Song & Syzmanski's Vibraphone Quartet
 2002: Road, Splash, & Koto
 2001: The People of the Forest & The Heart's Natural Inclination
 2000: Soothing the Enemy, Riley, Tango, & In to Get Out
 1999: Shostakovich String Quartet
 1998: Who Dressed You Like a Foreigner?, Tarab, & Long Straight Line
 1997: String Trio, Suite Etta, Three Stops On the Way Home, & Handel Trio
 1996: Klang, Sacred Text, Handel Pas de Deux, & Ground
 1995: Signs and Wonders, Rock, & String Quartet
 1994: Poulenc Pas de Deux, Ocean, & Along the Path
 1993: Bach Cello Suite, Compelling Geological Evidence, & Pavane
 1992: Gurdjieff Piano Music
 1991: Song of the Aka & Cante
 1990: Without Wax & Toccatta in D Minor
 1989: Lila & Fallen Angel
 1988: Awake in the Dream, Ligeti Variations, & Reoccurrence
 1987: Rain Dreaming & Granados Pas de Deux
 1986: Prayer & Stealing Light
 1983: Ictus
 1982: Danse Poulenc, Christine, & Sonata for Three Dancers

Collaborators
 
A listing of current and former Alonzo King LINES Ballet program collaborators:

Composers, Dancers, Musicians, Performers, and Artists

 Vân-Ánh Vanessa Võ - Composer, Musician 
 Kronos Quartet - String Quartet
 Zakir Hussain and Sabir Khan - Musicians 
 Bob Holman - Poet
 Lisa Fischer - Vocalist
 Charles Lloyd - Musician 
 El Hamideen - Musician
 Jean-Cristophe (JC) Maillard - Composer, Arranger, Musician
 San Francisco Opera Adler Fellows - Vocalists
 Melody of China - Music Ensemble 
 BaAka Nzamba Lela - Musician
 Maya Lahyani - Vocalist
 Miguel Frasconi - Composer
 Hamza El Din - Composer
 Mickey Hart - Musician
 Zakir Hussain - Musician
 Miya Masaoka - Composer, Musician
 Jason Moran - Musician 
 San Francisco's Philharmonia Baroque Orchestra - Music Ensemble 
 Edgar Meyer - Musician
 Bernice Johnson Reagon - Composer, Vocalist 
 Rita Sahai - Vocalist, Musician
 Pharoah Sanders - Musician 
 Somei Satoh - Composer
 Leslie Stuck - Composer
 Paweł Szymański - Composer
 Danny Glover - Actor
 Jim McKee - Sound Designer
 Richard Blackford - Composer
 Bernie Krause - Musician, Bioacoustician
 Arturo Fernandez - Choreographer, Dancer, Ballet Master
 Meredith Webster - Choreographer, Dancer, Ballet Master

Visual Artists
 Christopher Haas - Architect
 Irene Pijoan - Visual Artist
 Raymond Saunders - Visual Artist
 Alain Lortie - Lighting Designer
 Axel Morgenthaler - Lighting Designer
 Lisa J. Pinkham - Lighting Designer
 David Finn - Lighting Designer
 James F. Ingalls - Lighting Design
 Colleen Quen - Costume Designer
 Robert Wierzel - Lighting Designer
 Sandra Woodall - Costume Designer
 Jim Campbell - Visual Artist
 Jim Doyle - Water Specialist
 Dikayl Rimmasch - Photographer
 Marty Sohl - Photographer
 Angela Sterling - Photographer
 RJ Muna - Photographer
 Franck Thibault - Photographer
 Quinn Wharton -Photographer
 Austin Forbord - Videographer
 Jamie Lyons - Photographer/Videographer

External links 
 
 Selby/Artists MGMT – Artist Representation
 Alonzo King LINES Ballet
 Tracing Lines with Alonzo KING
 Alonzo King LINES Ballet BFA at Dominican University of California
 Alonzo King LINES Ballet at Aspen Ideas Festival
 Alonzo King LINES Ballet performing King's Migration  at Jacob’s Pillow Dance Festival

References 

 

Ballet companies in the United States
Culture of San Francisco
Performing groups established in 1982
1982 establishments in California
Dance in California